Niastella is a bacterial genus from the family of Chitinophagaceae.

References

Further reading 
 
 
 
 

Chitinophagia
Bacteria genera